Kamil Kopúnek (born 18 May 1984) is a Slovak former footballer who played as a defensive midfielder.

Club career

Spartak Trnava
Kamil Kopúnek started his career with his local club, Spartak Trnava. He became a first-team player in January 2002 at the young age of 17 and made his debut in spring 2002, receiving a red card in his first match. In October 2009, he became a captain.
He spent eight and one-half years there, leaving Trnava in summer 2010.

Saturn Moscow Oblast
On 27 August 2010, he joined the Russian Premier League club FC Saturn Moscow Oblast on a four-month contract. He played for Saturn in seven league games before the club was dissolved due to huge debts in January 2011.

Bari
Kopúnek signed a half-year contract with the Serie A club A.S. Bari on 31 January 2011. He made his debut on 13 March in a 1–1 draw against Milan at San Siro. In July 2011, he signed a three-year contract. His contract was ended by mutual consent in January 2012.

Slovan Bratislava
Despite he was born in Trnava and played for Spartak from childhood years he joined arch-rivals ŠK Slovan Bratislava since 19 January 2012.
He left the club in August 2013.

Ravan Baku
After going on trial with FC Bunyodkor in February 2014,  Kopúnek went on to sign for Ravan Baku of the Azerbaijan Premier League in March 2014. At the end of the 2013–14 season, Ravan were relegated to the Azerbaijan First Division, and whilst Kopúnek was still contracted to Ravan for the next season, he openly admitted to be looking for a new club.

Haladás
Kopúnek signed for Haladás in September 2014.

Zbrojovka Brno
Kopúnek signed a half-year contract with the Synot liga club FC Zbrojovka Brno on 20 March 2015.

International career
Kopúnek represented Slovakia on junior levels and played at the 2003 FIFA World Youth Championship in all four matches for national U-20 team.

On 1 March 2006, he made his senior national team debut in a 2–1 win against France at Stade de France in friendly match. He scored his first international goal against Cameroon on 29 May 2010 and was subsequently named to the Slovakia squad for the 2010 FIFA World Cup. On 24 June 2010, coming on as a substitute, he scored Slovakia's third goal with his first touch of the game in their group match against Italy which ended 3–2 and ultimately sent the Italians crashing out of the FIFA World Cup 2010.

Career statistics

Club

International goals

References

External links
Slovan Bratislava profile 
AS Bari profile 

1984 births
Living people
Sportspeople from Trnava
Association football midfielders
Slovak footballers
Slovak expatriate footballers
Slovakia international footballers
Slovakia youth international footballers
FC Spartak Trnava players
FC Saturn Ramenskoye players
S.S.C. Bari players
FC Zbrojovka Brno players
ŠK Slovan Bratislava players
Ravan Baku FC players
Szombathelyi Haladás footballers
FC Tatabánya players
A.S. Bisceglie Calcio 1913 players
Slovak Super Liga players
Russian Premier League players
Serie A players
Serie B players
Nemzeti Bajnokság I players
Azerbaijan Premier League players
Slovak expatriate sportspeople in Russia
Slovak expatriate sportspeople in Hungary
Slovak expatriate sportspeople in Italy
Expatriate footballers in Russia
Expatriate footballers in Italy
Expatriate footballers in Hungary
2010 FIFA World Cup players